The Ilunga government, from September 2019 to April 2021, was the Democratic Republic of the Congo government led by Sylvestre Ilunga as Prime Minister. President Tshisekedi signed the nomination order for the Ilunga government on 26 August 2019, and Ilunga assumed office on 7 September 2019.

Membership 
The members of the Ilunga government were:
 Prime Minister: Sylvestre Ilunga Ilunkamba

Deputy Prime Ministers:
 Minister of the Interior, Security and Traditional Affairs: Gilbert Kankonde Malamba
 Minister of Justice, Keeper of the Seals: Célestin Tunda Yakasende
 Minister of the Budget: Jean-Baudouin Mayo
 Minister of Planning: Élysée Minembwe
 Minister of Infrastructure and Public Works: Willy Ngopos

Ministers of State:
 Minister of Foreign Affairs: Marie Tumba Nzeza
 Minister of International Cooperation, Regional Integration and Francophonie: Guillaume Manjolo
 Minister of Hydrocarbons: Rubens Mukindo
 Minister of Decentralization and Institutional Reform: Azarias Ruberwa
 Minister of Water Resources and Electricity: Eustache Mubembe
 Minister of Employment, Labour and Social Security: Néné Nkulu Ilunga
 Minister of Primary, Secondary and Technical Education: Béatrice Lomeya
 Minister of Town Planning and Housing: Pius Mwabilu
 Minister of Communication and the Media: Jolino Makelele

Other Ministers:
 Minister of National Defence and War Veterans: Aimé Ngoyi Mukena
 Minister of Public Services: Yolande Ebongo Osongo
 Minister of Finance: José Sele
 Minister of the National Economy: Atasia Andu Bola
 Minister of Portfolio: Clément Kwete
 Minister of External Trade: Jean-Lucien Bussa
 Minister of Mining: Willy Itobo
 Minister of Postal Services, Telecommunications and New Information and Communication Services: Augustin Kibasa Maliba
 Minister of Health: Eteni Longondo
 Minister of Human Rights: André Lite
 Minister of Relations with Parliament: Deogratias Nkusu Bikawa
 Minister of the Environment and Sustainable Development: Claude Nyamugabo
 Minister of Transport and Communications: Didier Mazengu
 Minister of Agriculture: Jean Joseph Kasonga Mukuta
 Minister of Fishing and Stockbreeding: Jonathan Yalusuka Wata
 Minister of Rural Development: Guy Mukulu Pombo
 Minister of Social Affairs: Rose Boyata Monkaju
 Minister of Humanitarian Actions and  National Solidarity: Steve Mbikayi Mabuluki.
 Minister of Higher and University Education: Thomas Luhaka
 Minister of Scientific Research and Technological Innovation: José Mpanda Kabangu
 Minister of Land Management: Aimé Sakombi Molendo
 Ministry of Industry: Julien Paluku
 Minister of Professional Training, Arts and Crafts: John Ntumba
 Minister of Land Development: Aggeé Aje Matembo
 Minister of Entrepreneurship and Small and Medium-sized Enterprises: Justin Kalumba
 Minister of Youth and Initiation of New Citizenship: Herastone Sambale
 Minister of Sport and Leisure: Amos Mbayo
 Minister of Tourism: Yves Bokunlu Zola
 Minister of Culture and the Arts: Jean-Marie Lukundji Kikuni
 Minister to the President of the Republic: André Kabanda Kana
 Minister to the Prime Minister: Jacqueline Penge Sanganyoi

Minister-Delegates:
 Delegate to the Minister of National Defense and Veterans Affairs in charge of veterans: Sylvain Mutombo Kabinga
 Delegate to the Minister of the Interior Security and Traditional Affairs in charge of Traditional Affairs: Michel Mvunzi Meya
 Delegate to the Minister of Social Affairs in charge of people living with handicaps and other vulnerable persons: Irène Esambo

Deputy Ministers:
 Deputy Minister of Justice: Bernard Takaishe Ngumbi
 Deputy Minister of the Interior: Innocent Bokele Walaka
 Deputy Minister of Planning: Freddy Kita Pukusu
 Deputy Minister of the Budget: Félix Momat Kitenge
 Deputy Minister of Foreign Affairs and Congolese Abroad: Raymond Tshedia Patayi
 Deputy Minister of International and Regional Cooperation: Valérie Mukasa Muanabute
 Deputy Minister of Water Resources and Electricity: Papy Pungu Lwamba
 Deputy Minister of Primary, Secondary and Technical Education: Didier Budimbu
 Deputy Minister of Finance: Mata Melanga Junior
 Deputy Minister of National Economy: Didier Lutundula Okito
 Deputy Minister of Mining: Alpha Denise Lupetu
 Deputy Minister of Health: Albert Mpeti Biyombo
 Deputy Minister of the Environment: Jeanne Ilunga Zahina
 Deputy Minister of Higher and University Education: Liliane Banga
 Deputy Minister of Transport and Communication: Jacques Yuma Kipuya
 Deputy Minister of Professional Training, Arts and Crafts: Germain Kambinga

References

See also 
 Government of the Democratic Republic of the Congo

Government of the Democratic Republic of the Congo
2019 in the Democratic Republic of the Congo
2020 in the Democratic Republic of the Congo
2021 in the Democratic Republic of the Congo
2010s in politics
2020s in politics
Cabinets established in 2019
Cabinets disestablished in 2021
Cabinets of the Democratic Republic of the Congo